The 2021 Barcelona Dragons season was the first season of the new Barcelona Dragons team in the inaugural season of the European League of Football. Initially called Gladiators Football, the Barcelona franchise was renamed after the league announced it had reached an agreement with the NFL, to be able to use the team names from the days of NFL Europe.

Regular season

Standings

Schedule

Source: europeanleague.football

Roster

Notes

References 

Barcelona Dragons (ELF) seasons
2021 in Spanish sport
Barcelona Dragons